Southern Standard is a semi-daily newspaper based in McMinnville, Tennessee. It has a sports and business section.

References

External links
 Southern Standard website

Morris Multimedia
Newspapers published in Tennessee
Warren County, Tennessee